Berlaar is a municipality located in the Belgian province of Antwerp. In 2021, Berlaar had a total population of 11,710. The total area is 24.57 km².

History
The current municipality of Berlaar was founded on 1 January 1965. Berlaar is actually a fusion of the former municipality Gestel and the Core of Berlaar itself. Berlaar is a part of the Belgische Kempen.

According to legend, the citizens of the early Middle Ages couldn't agree on where the church had to be built. They let fate decide and let two bears fight over it. Where the one bear killed the other, that would be the location the church should be built. Hence the exceptional position of the church at the end of the village square and not in the centre as usual.

Climate

Gallery

References

External links
 
Official website (Dutch only)

 
Municipalities of Antwerp Province
Populated places in Antwerp Province